William C. Dix is a Republican politician and farmer from Shell Rock, Iowa. He was formerly the Majority Leader of the Iowa Senate representing Senate District 25, which covers Butler, Grundy, Hardin, and Story Counties. He served as the Chair of the Rules and Administration Senate Committee. 

He resigned from the Iowa Senate on March 12, 2018, following the release of video footage showing Dix, who is married with three children, kissing a lobbyist at a bar in Des Moines, Iowa.

Elections

Iowa House of Representatives (1996–2006) 
In 1996, Dix made his first bid for the Iowa House of Representatives running unopposed for House District 21 (covered Butler and Grundy Counties from 1993–2002 before redistricting from the 2000 Census) vacated by Robert H. Renken. Iowa Congressional and Legislative districts were redrawn after the 2000 Census that went into effect for the 2002 election. From 2002 to 2006, Dix represented House District 17 (covered Butler and Bremer Counties from 2002–2012). He served five two-year terms in the Iowa House being reelected in 1998, 2000, 2002, and 2004.

Iowa's 1st Congressional District Primary (2006) 
In 2006, Dix ran in the Republican Primary for Iowa's 1st Congressional District seat vacated by Jim Nussle.

Iowa Senate (2010–2018)

References 

Living people
People from Butler County, Iowa
People from Janesville, Iowa
Iowa Republicans
1962 births
21st-century American politicians
 Iowa politicians convicted of crimes